Reborn is the tenth solo studio album from Denny Laine.  It is his last all-original release until 2001.  It was reissued in 2001 as Reborn...Again by The Store for Music with bonus tracks.

Denny became friends with local property developer John Ashworth in Rossendale, Lancashire and they built a recording studio in the basement of John’s home in Whalley - Bramley Meade - which was a former maternity hospital.

The cover photo of Reborn is Denny stood in the entrance to Bramley Meade, with John Ashworth’s Bentley parked outside.

Denny also wrote the songs for a musical titled Arctic Song which was performed by the students of Stonyhurst College where John Ashworth’s two sons attended.

Arctic Song was released on CD in 1998 but wasn’t widely publicised. Denny performed all the songs in the CD.

Track listing
All tracks composed by Denny Laine
"In Time"  5.35
"Reborn"  3.59
"Rollin' Tide"  5.18
"Night Walker"  4.22
"Hard Labour"  5.05
"Misty Mountain"  4.52
"Fanfare"  4.52
"Within Walls"  4.29
"Eternal Quest"  5.29
"Phoenix"  5.33

Bonus tracks on Reborn...Again

"Go Now" 3.23
"Time to Hide"
"Again & Again & Again"
"Mull of Kintyre" 4.21

Personnel
Denny Laine
Alan Wormold, Chip Hawkes, Gary Roberts, Jackie Bodimead - backing vocals
Technical
Brian Adams - executive producer
David Simmonds - cover photography

References

Denny Laine albums
1996 albums